This list is of the Cultural Properties of Japan designated in the category of  for the Prefecture of Shizuoka.

National Cultural Properties
As of 1 February 2016, forty-six Important Cultural Properties have been designated (including one *National Treasure), being of national significance.

Prefectural Cultural Properties
As of 1 June 2015, thirty-eight properties have been designated at a prefectural level.

See also
 Cultural Properties of Japan
 List of National Treasures of Japan (paintings)
 Japanese painting
 List of Historic Sites of Japan (Shizuoka)
 List of Museums in Shizuoka Prefecture

References

External links
  Cultural Properties in Shizuoka Prefecture

Cultural Properties,Shizuoka
Cultural Properties,Paintings
Paintings,Shizuoka
Lists of paintings